Siya may refer to:

Siya (born 1987), American hip hop musical artist
Siya Kolisi (born 1991), South African rugby union player
Siya Masuku (born 1996), South African rugby union player
Siya Mdaka (born 1988), South African rugby union player
Siya Mngoma (born 1988), South African footballer
Siya Simetu (born 1991), South African cricketer
 Siya is a common name

See also 
Anthony of Siya (1479–1556), Russian Orthodox monk